Lothar Höhne (born 30 September 1938 in Marzahna, Wittenberg) is a retired German road cyclist. He won the Tour de Slovaquie in 1959 and the race Rund um Berlin in 1962 and 1964. In 1962 he also won one stage of the Peace Race.

References 

Living people
German male cyclists
Place of birth missing (living people)
People from Treuenbrietzen
1938 births
East German male cyclists
People from Bezirk Potsdam
Cyclists from Brandenburg